Hesychotypa heraldica is a species of beetle in the family Cerambycidae. It was described by Henry Walter Bates in 1872. It is known from Guatemala, Costa Rica, Honduras, Nicaragua, Belize, and Panama.

References

heraldica
Beetles described in 1872